Maitland is an electoral district of the Legislative Assembly in the Australian state of New South Wales.

The district encompasses most of the City of Maitland.

History
Maitland was created in 1904, replacing East Maitland and West Maitland. With the introduction of proportional representation in 1920, it absorbed parts of Upper Hunter, Singleton, Cessnock and Durham and elected three members.  With the end of proportional representation in 1927, Maitland was split into the single-member electorates of Maitland, Upper Hunter and Cessnock.

Members for Maitland

Election results

References

Maitland
Maitland, New South Wales
1904 establishments in Australia
Maitland